The FIBA Women's Basketball World Cup Most Valuable Player is an award, that is given by FIBA, to the Most Valuable Player of the FIBA Women's Basketball World Cup.

Winners

References

External links

MVP
Basketball trophies and awards